Charlestown Historic District is a national historic district at Charlestown, Cecil County, Maryland, United States. It consists of a  portion of the town containing all known existing 18th century features.  There are 14 houses known to have been constructed during that century and its largest structures were the inns and hotels which served the popular Charlestown Fair in the colonial period.

It was added to the National Register of Historic Places in 1975.

References

External links
, including photo from 1985, at Maryland Historical Trust
Boundary Map of the Charlestown Historic District, Carroll County, at Maryland Historical Trust

Historic districts in Cecil County, Maryland
Historic districts on the National Register of Historic Places in Maryland
National Register of Historic Places in Cecil County, Maryland